Petrusville is a village in the eastern Karoo region of South Africa, located in the Northern Cape province.

It is 45 km north-east of Philipstown, 56 km south-east of Kraankuil and 10 km south of the Orange River. Founded about 1877 on the farm Rhenosterfontein and named after Petrus Jacobus van der Walt who had bought it in 1810 and donated a portion of it to the Dutch Reformed Church in 1822.

References

Populated places in the Renosterberg Local Municipality
Populated places established in 1877
1877 establishments in the Cape Colony